Gödel's proof may refer to:
Gödel's incompleteness theorems
Gödel's ontological proof

See also: Gödel's theorem (disambiguation)